Bryon Nickoloff (June 23, 1956 – August 3, 2004) was a Canadian International Master of chess. He represented Canada six times at chess Olympiads.

Early years 

Nickoloff, born of Bulgarian heritage in Toronto to emigre parents, came to chess at age 15, which is relatively late among players who eventually reached international standard. Within three years, he was playing at National Master strength. He won the Toronto City Championship in 1978, and repeated in 1997 (shared) and 1998 (source: David Cohen's Canadian Chess site).

International team play 

He was top board for Canada at the World U26 Olympiad in Mexico 1978, leading the team to a 6th-place finish. He made his first of six Olympiad appearances for Canada later that year. In 68 games, he scored (+21 =27 -20), for 50.7 per cent. His international teams record, from (http://www.olimpbase.org/playersk/959vhldg.html), follows.

 Mexico City 1978 U26 Olympiad, board 1, 5/11 (+3 =4 -4); 
 Buenos Aires 1978 Olympiad, 1st reserve, 2.5/6 (+1 =3 -2);
 Dubai 1986 Olympiad, board 2, 6.5/12 (+4 =5 -3);
 Thessaloniki 1988 Olympiad, 2nd reserve, 6/10 (+4 =4 -2);
 Novi Sad 1990 Olympiad, board 3, 6/10 (+4 =4 -2);
 Moscow 1994 Olympiad, board 3, 3.5/9 (+2 =3 -4);
 Elista 1998 Olympiad, board 3, 5/10 (+3 =4 -3).

Nickoloff moved to Mexico in 1978, married a Mexican woman, and earned his International Master title in 1981, following a string of top finishes in Mexican events in the late 1970s and early 1980s. His peak FIDE rating was 2470 in 1982, within the world's top 100 players at that time. Following a divorce, he returned to live in Toronto in the early 1980s, and played board one for the University of Toronto, leading the team to a title in the 1982 Pan American Intercollegiate Team Chess Championship.

Canadian Championship near-misses 

Nickoloff, while certainly one of Canada's top players for about 30 years, from the mid-1970s until his death at age 48 in 2004, never managed to win the Canadian Chess Championship in his nine attempts, although he was usually challenging near the top. He did remarkably well in his first attempt in 1978 at Toronto (Zonal), which was only seven years after he learned how to play. He scored 9/15 to share 7-8th places, with Jean Hébert winning. He was fifth at Ottawa (Zonal) 1984 on 8.5/15, with Kevin Spraggett winning. At the Winnipeg (Zonal) 1986, he scored 7/16 to share 8-9th places, with Spraggett and Igor Ivanov winning.

His closest approach to the Canadian title came from Windsor (Zonal) 1989, where he tied for 2nd-3rd places with Leon Piasetski, on 10/15. With champion Kevin Spraggett already qualified for the 1990 Interzonal as a Candidate from the previous world title cycle, Canada had a bonus Interzonal berth, for which Nickoloff and Piasetski had to settle accounts, with a four-game match at Toronto 1990. With a career edge over Piasetski going in, and after scoring 1.5/2 to start, Nickoloff needed only a draw in either of the last two games to advance, because of a superior tiebreak score from Windsor. But he lost the last two games and the match.

Nickoloff was off-form at Kingston (Zonal) 1992, scoring just 3.5/11 for 10th place, as Alexandre Lesiège won. Another near miss was his shared 3rd-5th place at Hamilton (Zonal) 1994, on 10/15, with Spraggett again the champion. At the controversy-marred Canadian Championship in Ottawa 1995, Nickoloff fell asleep at the board during a game when it was his move, and his clock ran on. Nickoloff was eventually awoken by another competitor (Kiviaho), and this led to a string of arguments and appeals, which disrupted the chess in subsequent rounds. Nickoloff scored 4.5/8, with Ron Livshits winning. Nickoloff was 5th at Toronto (Zonal) 1996 on 9/15, with Spraggett winning his fifth Zonal in six attempts. At Brantford (Zonal) 1999, Nickoloff scored 5/9 for a shared 7-10th place, with Lesiege winning.

Nickoloff won the Canadian Open Chess Championship in 1992 and 1995 (David Cohen's Canadian Chess site). He won the 1985 Motor City Open in Detroit with 5.5/6. Nickoloff won the Ontario Open Championship in 1993 (shared), 1994, and 2000. He won the Ontario Championship in 1992 (shared) (source: David Cohen's Canadian Chess site). He won several dozen weekend Swiss tournaments in the Toronto area during his career.

Later years, legacy 

Nickoloff, a bon vivant much like Mikhail Tal, indulged himself with alcohol, tobacco, and many late nights. When just in his early 40s, he was diagnosed with incurable stomach cancer in the late 1990s, and was in serious condition, losing much weight and strength. He received hundreds of letters from chess friends around the world, gathered inspiration from their support, and managed to survive until 2004, playing high-level tournament chess right to the end, which demonstrated to everyone his passion for chess and his great fighting spirit. He tied for first place at the Toronto Pan American Open at the end of 1999, despite his weakened condition. His last tournament was the 2004 Canadian Open Chess Championship in Kapuskasing, where, although badly emaciated by the disease, he managed to score 6.5/10, playing several fine games. Two weeks later, he died in hospital at age 48.

Nickoloff often played the Arkhangelsk variation in the Ruy Lopez, in which he played many important theoretical games.

In 2007, International Master Lawrence Day, a close friend and colleague, published the book Nick's Best, from Chess'n Math Association publishers. The book is an annotated collection of his best games, along with many stories from his colorful life. The site chessgames.com has 150 of his games, while the site mychess.com has 440 Nickoloff games.

References

External links 

 
 Bryon Nickoloff Official Fan Site http://www.bryonnickoloff.com/

1956 births
2004 deaths
Deaths from stomach cancer
Deaths from cancer in Ontario
Canadian chess players
Chess International Masters
Sportspeople from Toronto
University of Toronto alumni
Canadian people of Bulgarian descent
20th-century chess players